Oliynyk, also Oliinyk, Oliynik is a Ukrainian-language surname derived from the word Олія, "oil".
The surname may refer to:

Andriy Oliynyk (disambiguation)
Andriy Olehovych Oliynyk, Ukrainian footballer
Andriy Petrovych Oliynyk, Ukrainian footballer
Borys Oliynyk (disambiguation)
 Borys Oliynyk (poet), Ukrainian poet
 Borys Oliynyk (Ukrzaliznytsia), director of the Ukrainian Railways
Denys Oliynyk, Ukrainian footballer
Pavlo Oliynyk, Ukrainian Olympian
Todd Oliynyk, a 2011 recipient of the Australian Mathematical Society Medal
Volodymyr Oliynyk, Party of Regions politician, 1999 presidential candidate
Vyacheslav Oliynyk, Ukrainian Olympian
Yaroslav Oliynyk, Ukrainian footballer
Yuriy Oliynyk, American musician from Ukraine

See also
 
Olenik
Olejnik, Polish version
Oleynik, Russian version

Ukrainian-language surnames
Surnames of Ukrainian origin